Oktay Sinanoğlu (February 25, 1935 – April 19, 2015) was a Turkish physical chemist and molecular biophysicist who made significant contributions to the theory of electron correlation in molecules, quantum chemistry, and the theory of solvation.

Private life
Sinanoğlu was born in Bari, Italy on February 25, 1935 to Nüzhet Haşim and Rüveyde (Karacabey) Sinanoğlu. His father was a consular official under the Consul General Atıf Kor in the Bari Consulate of Turkey, and a writer. Following his father's recall to Turkey in July 1938, the family returned to Turkey before the start of World War II. He had a sister, Esin Afşar (1936-2011), who became a well-known singer and actress.

Sinanoğlu graduated from TED Ankara Koleji in 1951. He went to the United States in 1953, where he studied in University of California, Berkeley  graduating with a BSc degree with highest honors in 1956. The following year, he completed his MSc at MIT (1957), and was awarded a Sloan Research Fellowship. He completed his predoctoral fellowship (1958-1959) and earned his PhD in physical chemistry (1959-1960) from the University of California, Berkeley.

On December 21, 1963, Oktay Sinanoğlu married Paula Armbruster, who was doing graduate work at Yale University. The wedding ceremony took place in the Branford College Chapel of Yale.

After their later divorce, he remarried to Dilek Sinanoğlu and from this marriage he became the father of twins. The family resided in the Emerald Lakes neighborhood of Fort Lauderdale, Florida and in Istanbul, Turkey.

Academic career 
In 1960, Sinanoğlu joined the chemistry department at Yale University.  He was appointed full professor of chemistry in 1963.  At age 28, he became the youngest full professor in Yale’s 20th-century history. It is believed that he was the third-youngest full professor in the 300-plus year history of Yale University.

During his tenure at Yale he wrote a number of papers in various subfields of theoretical chemistry, the most widely cited of which was his 1961 paper on electron correlation. This work anticipated the widely used coupled cluster method for describing electrons in molecules with greater accuracy than is possible via the Hartree-Fock method. He also published papers on solvation, chemical reaction networks, and surface tension. His final projects were focused on the development of his valency interaction formula (VIF) theory, a method for predicting energy level patters for compounds from the manipulation of graphs (1983). He intended for chemists to be able to use his system to predict the ways in which complex chemical reactions would proceed, using only a chalkboard or pencil and paper. He continued to develop the VIF method, which he sometimes referred to as "Sinanoğlu Made Simple," and other problems related to graph theory and quantum mechanics for the rest of his career.   After 37 years on the Yale faculty, Sinanoğlu retired in 1997. 

During his time at Yale, Sinanoğlu served as a frequent consultant to several Turkish universities and to the Scientific and Technological Research Council of Turkey (TÜBİTAK) as well as to the Japan Society for the Promotion of Science (JSPS). In 1962, the Board of Trustees of Middle East Technical University in Ankara granted him the title of "consulting professor."

After his retirement from Yale, Sinanoğlu was appointed to the chemistry department of Yıldız Technical University in Istanbul, serving until 2002.

Sinanoğlu was the author or co-author of over 200 scientific articles and books. He also authored books on contemporary affairs in Turkey and Turkish language, such as "Target Turkey" and "Bye Bye Turkish" (2005). In "Bye Bye Turkish", he propounded the idea of cognation between Turkish and Japanese based on the alleged similarity of a number of words.

A 2001 best-seller book about his life and works, edited by Turkish writer Emine Çaykara, referred to him as "The Turkish Einstein, Oktay Sinanoğlu".

Honors 
He received the "TÜBİTAK Science Award" for chemistry in 1966, the Alexander von Humboldt Research Award in chemistry in 1973, and the "International Outstanding Scientist Award of Japan" in 1975. Sinanoğlu was also a two-time nominee for the Nobel Prize in Chemistry.

Death
His wife Dilek Sinanoğlu made public on April 10, 2015 that Oktay Sinanoğlu was hospitalized in Miami, Florida, and was in a coma in the intensive care unit.  He died at age 80 on April 19, 2015. No medical statement was released about the cause of the death. His body was transferred to Turkey, where he was buried in Karacaahmet Cemetery, Üsküdar following the religious funeral service at Şakirin Mosque.

References

External links
 List of publications by Oktay Sinanoğlu

1935 births
2015 deaths
People from Bari
TED Ankara College Foundation Schools alumni
University of California, Berkeley alumni
Massachusetts Institute of Technology alumni
Sloan Research Fellows
Theoretical chemists
Turkish chemists
Turkish biochemists
Turkish expatriates in the United States
Yale University faculty
Academic staff of Middle East Technical University
Academic staff of Yıldız Technical University
Recipients of TÜBİTAK Science Award
Burials at Karacaahmet Cemetery